Benedetto Antelami (c. 1150 – c. 1230) was an Italian architect and sculptor of the Romanesque school, whose "sculptural style sprang from local north Italian traditions that can be traced back to late antiquity"   Little is known about his life. He was probably originally from Lombardy, perhaps born in Val d'Intelvi. It is believed from the Provençal style of his art that he served as apprentice at  Saint-Trophime d'Arles. In 1178 he was at work at the Parma Cathedral, where, in the right transept, he executed a bas-relief of the Deposition from the Cross. His name and the date are inscribed in the work, which, in addition to the Provençal element, shows both classical and Byzantine influence.

Later, in 1196, he was working with the sculptural decoration of the Baptistry of Parma, a building of which he was probably also the architect. Here, between 1196 and 1214, he made the lunettes of the three portals: on the outside portraying the Adoration of the Magi, the Last Judgement and an allegory of life, on the inside the Flight into Egypt, the Presentation at the Temple and David playing the harp. Also on the interiori can be seen alto-relievo personifications of the months and the seasons. These were probably intended for a portal on the facade of the Cathedral, but the work was interrupted by Antelami’s death.

There are remarkable stylistic similarities with figures on the outer arch of the north porch", at Chartres cathedral in France in 1213. Presumably he went travelling in his 50s, and this opens the possibility that more of his work may be found along the roads he may have taken.

Benedetto's sculpture is also to be found in the Fidenza Cathedral, dedicated to Saint Domninus of Fidenza.

The main west door of the Basilica di San Marco, Venice, is also attributed by some to Antelami or his school, and the current replacement version of the Holy Face of Lucca (the Volto Santo) is ascribed to his circle.

References

Sources
 Moritz Woelk: Benedetto Antelami – Die Werke in Parma und Fidenza. Rhema-Verlag, Münster 1995, 

1150s births
1230s deaths
People from the Province of Como
12th-century Italian architects
12th-century Italian sculptors
Italian male sculptors
13th-century Italian architects
13th-century Italian sculptors
Romanesque artists